Black on Both Sides is the debut solo studio album by American rapper Mos Def, released on October 12, 1999, by Rawkus and Priority Records. Prior to its recording, Mos Def had collaborated with Talib Kweli for the album Mos Def & Talib Kweli Are Black Star in 1998, which raised high expectations for a solo effort by the former. Black on Both Sides features an emphasis on live instrumentation and socially conscious lyrics.

On February 2, 2000, the album was certified Gold in sales by the Recording Industry Association of America (RIAA), following sales in excess of 500,000 copies.

Music
Talib Kweli (one-half of Black Star with Mos Def), Q-Tip and Busta Rhymes are the only main rappers to be featured on the album. Kweli raps the second and final verse of "Know That", while Busta goes back and forth with Mos on "Do It Now". Q-Tip helps sing the chorus on "Mr. Nigga" but doesn't deliver a verse. The lyrics Q-Tip recites are similar to his previously released lyrics on A Tribe Called Quest's "Sucka Nigga". Vinia Mojica (who is known for singing on Native Tongues songs) also sings a duet with Mos Def on the song "Climb".

Production
The album features a mix between established and rising producers. DJ Premier provides the instrumental track for "Mathematics". Diamond D is credited for "Hip Hop". Ali Shaheed Muhammad, known mostly as a member of A Tribe Called Quest, produced the seventh song "Got". Psycho Les of The Beatnuts produced "New World Water" and "Rock N Roll". Jazz legend Weldon Irvine provided additional production to "Climb".

Ayatollah produced "Ms. Fat Booty" and "Know That". 88-Keys produced "Love" and "Speed Law" and co-produced the instrumental outro "May–December" with Mos Def himself. David Kennedy (the second swing of "Brooklyn" and "Umi Says" produced with Mos Def), Mr. Khaliyl ("Do It Now"), DJ Etch-A-Sketch ("Climb" and "Habitat"), Ge-ology (The first swing of "Brooklyn") and D. Prosper ("Mr. Nigga") round out the other contributors.

Mos received production assistance on most of the album's tracks. His sole production credit comes at "Fear Not of Man", but he provided additional production to four tracks ("Hip Hop", "Rock N Roll", "Climb" and "Mr. Nigga") and co-produced three ("Umi Says", "Brooklyn" and "May–December").

Early versions
On the song "Brooklyn", a three-movement piece dedicated to Mos's neighborhood in Bedford-Stuyvesant, New York, Mos rhymes three verses over three different beats. The first beat is an original composition produced by Ge-ology, while the second verse is a re-creation Smif-N-Wessun's "Home Sweet Home" and the last verse is set to the instrumental track of The Notorious B.I.G.'s 1995 single "Who Shot Ya?". Originally, Mos rhymed three complete verses over Ge-ology's musical composition, now referred to as the first movement of the song. On a later version, the first and third verses are set to the instrumentals of two other 1995 New York rap hits, "Incarcerated Scarfaces" by Raekwon as well as "Give Up the Goods (Just Step)" by Mobb Deep, respectively. The "Who Shot Ya?" verse, with the same vocal take on the released version, is placed in the middle. Mos Def sings his own interpretation of the Red Hot Chili Peppers song "Under the Bridge".

Video
Mos Def was involved with two videos for Umi Says. One was more traditional, while the second one came when Nike and Jordan Brand chose "Umi Says" as its theme song for its Much Respect series of commercials for the Air Jordan XVI. As a result, the second video features appearances from Michael Finley, Eddie Jones, Derek Jeter, Roy Jones Jr., Ray Allen and even Michael Jordan himself.

Reception

Black on Both Sides received universal acclaim from critics. Matt Diehl of Entertainment Weekly praised the album's diversity and noted, "Merging old-school bravado with new-school poetics, the Brooklyn legend spouts incisive Afrocentric reality that takes all sides into account." Dan Leroy of Yahoo! Music opined that "Not since Rakim's heyday has a mic-rocker so clearly articulated such complex and entertaining thoughts, with the ability to wax eloquently on matters metaphysical ('Love') and just plain physical ('Ms. Fat Booty')" and hailed the album as "a sure pick as one of the year's best."

The Independent lauded the record's "sharp reflections on a range of subjects from parochialism to pollution, fear to fat booties, rap to rock 'n' roll" and wrote that Black on Both Sides "stands as a proud example of the heights hip-hop can achieve when its exponents put their minds to it." The Village Voices Robert Christgau wrote that while he felt the album ran too long, "the wealth of good-hearted reflection and well-calibrated production overwhelms one's petty objections". In a retrospective review, Charles Aaron of Spin described Mos Def as a "restless B-Boy citizen of the world" and called the album "playful, witty, and heart-pounding."

Track listing

Notes
  signifies an additional producer.

Sample credits
 "Fear Not of Man" contains a sample of "Fear Not for Man", performed by Fela Kuti; and a sample of "Morgenspaziergang" by Kraftwerk.
 "Hip Hop" contains a sample of "The Warnings (Part II)", performed by David Axelrod; and a sample of "Slow Dance" by Stanley Clarke.
 "Love" contains a sample of "Porgy (I Loves You, Porgy)", performed by Bill Evans Trio.
 "Ms. Fat Booty" contains a sample of "One Step Ahead", performed by Aretha Franklin.
 "Speed Law" contains a sample of "And That's Saying a Lot", performed by Christine McVie; and a sample of "Promise Her Anything but Give Her Arpeggio", performed by Big Brother & the Holding Company.
 "Do It Now" contains a sample of "Marcus Garvey", performed by Burning Spear.
 "Rock N Roll" contains a sample of "Memphis at Sunrise", performed by Bar-Kays.
 "Know That" contains a sample of "Anyone Who Had a Heart", performed by Dionne Warwick.
 "Brooklyn" contains a sample of "What Are You Doing the Rest of Your Life?", performed by Milt Jackson; a sample of "We Live in Brooklyn, Baby", performed by Roy Ayers; and a sample of "Who Shot Ya?", performed by The Notorious B.I.G..
 "Habitat" contains a sample of "Hard To Handle", performed by Otis Redding.
 "Mr. Nigga" contains a sample of "A Legend in His Own Mind", performed by Gil-Scott Heron.
 "Mathematics" contains a sample of "Baby I'm-a Want You", performed by The Fatback Band; a sample of "Angela Davis Interviewed by Art Seigner", performed by Angela Davis; a sample of "On & On", performed by Erykah Badu; and a sample of "Funky Drummer", performed by James Brown.
 "May–December" contains a sample of "Jungle Jazz", performed by Kool & the Gang; and a sample of "Rock Your Baby", performed by KC & the Sunshine Band.

Charts 

Singles

Certifications

References

Sources

External links
 Black on Both Sides at Acclaimed Music
 Black on Both Sides at Discogs
 Album Review at RapReviews

1999 debut albums
Mos Def albums
Rawkus Records albums
Albums produced by DJ Premier
Albums produced by Diamond D
Albums produced by Ayatollah
Albums produced by 88-Keys